Millerieae is a tribe of flowering plants belonging to the Asteroideae subfamily. Of all the genera, only Galinsoga, Guizotia, and Sigesbeckia have species native to the Old World.

Subtribes and genera
Millerieae subtribes and genera recognized by the Global Compositae Database as of April 2022:
Subtribe Desmanthodiinae  
Desmanthodium  
Subtribe Dyscritothamninae  
Dyscritothamnus  
Subtribe Espeletiinae  
Espeletia 
Ichthyothere 
Smallanthus 
Tamananthus 
Subtribe Galinsoginae  
Alepidocline 
Alloispermum 
Aphanactis 
Bebbia 
Cymophora 
Faxonia 
Freya 
Galinsoga 
Oteiza 
Sabazia 
Schistocarpha 
Selloa 
Tridax 
Subtribe Guardiolinae  
Guardiola 
Subtribe Jaegeriinae  
Jaegeria 
Subtribe Melampodiinae  
Acanthospermum 
Lecocarpus 
Melampodium 
Subtribe Milleriinae  
Axiniphyllum 
Guizotia 
Micractis 
Milleria 
Rumfordia 
Sigesbeckia 
Stachycephalum 
Trigonospermum 
Zandera 
Subtribe incertae sedis
Tetragonotheca

References

External links

Millerieae - Pictures

 
Asteraceae tribes